Blink is the fifth album by Christian singer Plumb. Released in 2007 via Curb Records, it is a collection of songs inspired by the singer's experiences as a mother.
The album includes the single "In My Arms."

Track listing 
 "My Sweet, My Lovely" (Lee, Shankel) – 4:01
 "God Will Take Care of You" – 4:55
 "In My Arms" (Bose, Bronleewe, Lee) – 4:03
 "Always" (Lee, Shankel) – 3:44
 "Children of the Heavenly Father" – 5:29
 "Blink" (Bose, Collins, Lee) – 3:56
 "My Child" (Bose, Lee, Snyder) – 4:29
 "Me" (Lee, Wells) – (4:33)
 "Sleep" (Bronleewe, Lee) – 5:20
 "Solomon's Song" (Bronleewe, Lee) – 5:18

Singles 
 "In My Arms" No. 3 Billboard Hot Dance Music/Club Play Charts, No. 10 Billboard Hot Adult Contemporary Tracks, No. 24 Hot Christian Songs

Personnel 
 Jeremy Bose – Arranger, Programming, Producer, Engineer, Mixing
 David Davidson – Violin
 Jeremy Lee – Executive Producer
 Tiffany Arbuckle Lee – Arranger
 John Ozier – A&R
 Tamara Smith – Whistle
 Bryan Stewart – Executive Producer, A&R
 Rusty Varenkamp – Editing, Mixing
 Hank Williams – Mastering

Chart performance

Awards 
In 2008, the album was nominated for a Dove Award for Pop/Contemporary Album of the Year at the 39th GMA Dove Awards.

References

External links
 [ Billboard magazine review]
 CCM Magazine Review

2007 albums
Plumb (singer) albums
Curb Records albums